The Rural Municipality of Churchbridge No. 211 is a rural municipality (RM) in the Canadian province of Saskatchewan within Census Division No. 5 and  Division No. 1. It is located in the east-central portion of the province.

History 
The RM of Churchbridge No. 211 incorporated as a rural municipality on January 1, 1913.

Geography

Communities and localities 
The following urban municipalities are surrounded by the RM.

Towns
Churchbridge

Villages
MacNutt

The following unincorporated communities are within the RM.

Localities
Beresina

Demographics 

Government 
The RM of Churchbridge No. 211 is governed by an elected municipal council and an appointed administrator that meets on the second Tuesday of every month. The reeve of the RM is Neil Mehrer while its administrator is Brenda Goulden. The RM's office is located in Churchbridge.

References 

C

Populated places established in 1913
1913 establishments in Saskatchewan
Division No. 5, Saskatchewan